= Collapsible flow =

Collapsible flow is a phenomenon that occurs in steady flow in tubes with significant distensibility, or the capability of swelling or stretching, under conditions of lower internal pressure relative to pressure outside the tube. Such conditions occur rarely in industrial applications but are very common in biological studies such as blood flow in veins and air flow in lungs.

When a flow is driven through a deformable channel or tube, interactions between fluid-mechanical and elastic forces can lead to a variety of biologically significant phenomena, including nonlinear pressure-drop/flow-rate relations, wave propagation, and the generation of instabilities. Understanding the physical origin and nature of these phenomena remains a significant experimental, analytical, and computational challenge, involving unsteady flows at low or high Reynolds numbers, large-amplitude fluid-structure interactions, free-surface flows, and intrinsically 2D or 3D motion. Whereas frequently the internal flow involves a single fluid phase (albeit often of a complex biological fluid such as blood), in many instances the presence of two or more distinct flowing phases is of primary importance (as is the case for air-liquid flows in peripheral lung airways, for example).

== Single Phase in Collapsible Tubes ==
Venous collapse is important during exercise, when muscular compression of leg veins is used to pump blood against gravity up to the heart, and in therapeutic compression of leg veins for the treatment of deep-vein thrombosis

partial vessel collapse occurs in vessels which undergo conditions of higher external pressure relative to the fluid within and can be difficult to predict mathematically. As such, devices such as a Starling Resistor are often used to predict fluid flow under these conditions.

Fluid is forced through an elastically deforming tube which passes through a region of high external pressure causing a flattening of the tube depending on the relative pressures of the inside and outside of the tube.

In the absence of any flow (puD pd), an increase in pe generates a compressive stress in the tube wall causing it to buckle from a circular to an elliptic cross-section (except, of course, near its ends, where it is attached to the rigid tubes). Buckling to a shape with more than two lobes may arise in short, tethered, or inhomogeneous tubes. Once buckled, the tube becomes highly compliant so that small additional increases in pe lead to a substantial reduction in cross-sectional area ®. Further compression leads to contact of the opposite tube walls, first at a point, and then along a line (Figure 2, left); once in opposite-wall contact, the tube's compliance falls because strong bending forces in the tube wall at the bulbous end of each lobe provide an increasing resistance to area reductions. The “tube law,” the relation between transmural pressure P – Pexternal (where p is the internal pressure) and $alpha$, for a long thin-walled tube can be approximated by thin-shell theory for an axially uniform elastic ring
